Helen Marguerite Clark (February 22, 1883 – September 25, 1940) was an American stage and silent film actress. As a movie actress, at one time, Clark was second only to Mary Pickford in popularity. All but five of her films are considered lost.

Early life and theatre

Born in Avondale, Cincinnati, Ohio on February 22, 1883, she was the third child of Augustus "Gus" James and Helen Elizabeth Clark. She had an older sister, Cora, and an older brother named Clifton. Clark's mother Helen died on January 21, 1893. Her father worked in his self-owned successful haberdashery located in downtown Cincinnati before his death on December 29, 1896. Following his death, Clark's sister Cora was appointed her legal guardian and removed her from public school to further her education at Ursuline Academy.

She finished school at age 16, decided to pursue a career in the theatre and soon made her Broadway debut in 1900. The 17-year-old performed at various venues. In 1903, she was seen on Broadway opposite hulking comedian DeWolf Hopper in Mr. Pickwick. The  Hopper dwarfed the nearly  Clark in their scenes together. Several adventure-fantasy roles followed. In 1909, Clark starred in the whimsical costume play The Beauty Spot, establishing the fantasy stories which would soon become her hallmark. In 1910, Clark appeared in The Wishing Ring, a play directed by Cecil DeMille which was later made into a motion picture by Maurice Tourneur. That same 1910 season had Clark appearing in Baby Mine, a popular play produced by William A. Brady.

In 1912, Clark performed in a lead role with John Barrymore, Doris Keane and Gail Kane in the play The Affairs of Anatol, later made into a motion picture by Clark's future movie studio Famous Players-Lasky and directed by Cecil DeMille. That same year, she starred in a retelling of Snow White and the Seven Dwarfs. The classic tale was adapted for the stage by Winthrop Ames (writing under the pseudonym Jessie Braham White), who closely oversaw its production at his Little Theatre in New York and personally selected the lead actress. Clark expressed her delight in the role, and the play had a successful run into 1913. Clark's popularity led to her signing a contract in 1914 to make motion pictures with Adolph Zukor's Famous Players Film Company, and over the next two years she was cast in starring roles in more than a dozen features. She then reprised her stage role in a film that would define the Clark persona—the influential 1916 screen version of Snow White.

Film career

At age 31, it was relatively late in life for a film actress to begin a career with starring roles, but the diminutive Clark had a little-girl look, like Mary Pickford, that belied her years. Also, film was not developed or mature enough to showcase Clark at her youthful best at the turn of the century. These were some of the reasons established Broadway stars refused early film offers. Feature films were unheard of when Clark was in her early 20s. She made her first appearance on screen in the short film Wildflower, directed by Allan Dwan.

In 1915, Clark starred as "Gretchen" in a feature-length production of The Goose Girl based on a 1909 best-selling novel by Harold MacGrath. She performed in the feature-length production The Seven Sisters (1915), directed by Sidney Olcott, and she reprised a Broadway role, starring in the first feature-length film version of Snow White (1916).

Clark was directed in this by J. Searle Dawley, as well as in a number of films, notably when she played the characters of both "Little Eva St. Clair" and "Topsy" in the feature Uncle Tom's Cabin (1918).

Clark starred in Come Out of the Kitchen (1919), which was filmed in Pass Christian, Mississippi, at Ossian Hall. The same year, she enrolled as a yeowoman in the naval reserves. Clark made all but one of her 40 films with Famous Players-Lasky, her last with them in 1920 titled Easy to Get, in which she starred opposite silent film actor Harrison Ford. Her next film, in 1921, was made by her own production company for First National Pictures distribution. As one of the most popular actresses going into the 1920s, and one of the industry's best paid, her name alone was enough to ensure reasonable box office success. As such, Scrambled Wives was made under her direction, following which she retired at age 38 to be with her husband at their country estate in New Orleans.

Personal life
On August 15, 1918, Clark married New Orleans, Louisiana, plantation owner and millionaire businessman Harry Palmerston Williams, a marriage that ended with the death of Williams on May 19, 1936 in an aircraft crash. After his death, Clark owned Wedell-Williams Air Service Corporation, which had built and flown air racers, along with other aviation enterprises, until sold in 1937.

Death
After the death of her husband, Clark moved to New York City where she lived with her sister Cora. On September 20, 1940, she entered LeRoy Sanitarium where she died five days later of  pneumonia. A private funeral was held at Frank E. Campbell Funeral Chapel on September 28. She was cremated and buried with her husband in Metairie Cemetery in New Orleans.

For her contribution to the motion picture industry, Marguerite Clark has a star on the Hollywood Walk of Fame at 6304 Hollywood Boulevard.

Broadway credits

Filmography

References

Notes

Bibliography

 Blum, Daniel. Pictorial History of the American Theater. New York: Random House Value Publishing, First edition 1950. .
 Nunn, Curtis. Marguerite Clark: America's Darling of Broadway and the Silent Screen. Fort Worth, Texas: The Texas Christian University Press, 1981. .

Further reading

External links

 
 
 Contemporary interviews with Marguerite Clark
 Marguerite Clark page at Corbis
 Marguerite Clark gallery NY Public Library
Marguerite Clark bio & pics
portrait of Marguerite Clark and DeWolf Hopper on Broadway in Happyland (1905) Univ. of Washington/Sayre Collection

1883 births
1940 deaths
19th-century American actresses
20th-century American actresses
Actresses from Cincinnati
American film actresses
American silent film actresses
American stage actresses
Burials at Metairie Cemetery
Deaths from pneumonia in New York City
People from Avondale, Cincinnati